The Taurus SMT is a family of submachine guns manufactured by Taurus Firearms. It was introduced in early 2011, under the designation MT G2.

Taurus also offers a semi-automatic only variant of the MT G2, known as the CT G2, which is intended for the civilian and security markets.

Variants 
Taurus offers the SMT in two different variants; the SMT9 and SMT40, the only difference between the two is their calibre.

The Taurus CT G2 is a semi-automatic only pistol-caliber carbine variant of the MT G2. It was first announced at the 2011 SHOT Show. The CTT40 is a further evolution of the CT G2 series.

Operators
 
Brazilian Army
Law enforcement in Brazil
 
: Taurus SMT9C used by Ground Specialized Unit (41 Squadron).
Bangladesh Police: Taurus SMT9C used by Crisis Response Team (CRT).

Police of Republika Srpska

References 

Submachine guns
Carbines
Semi-automatic rifles
Firearms of Brazil